Orygocera propycnota is a species of moth of the family Oecophoridae. It is known from Toamasina, Madagascar.

The wingspan is about 20 mm. The forewings are shining violet-white, the costal two-fifths suffused pale reddish-ochreous, the costal edge white, a fringe of dense whitish hairs from the costa covering the costal fourth of the wing from the base to two-thirds. There is a dark reddish-fuscous streak along the basal fourth of the dorsum, suffused white and ferruginous beneath and a very oblique dark crimson streak crossing the white area about the middle of the wing, continued along the dorsum to the tornus, and from the middle of the posterior edge sending a curved streak which meets the dorsal portion at the tornus, these markings partly suffused ferruginous. The hindwings are whitish, tinged ochreous towards the apex.

References

Orygocera
Moths described in 1930